"I'm on One" (stylized in all caps) is a song by American rapper Future from his ninth studio album I Never Liked You (2022). It features Canadian rapper Drake and was produced by Torey Montana.

Background
Following the song's release, Future shared details of how it came together in an interview on Apple Music 1:

"We just did those records just because it was just the timing of it, but it was inevitable, you know what I'm saying, for it to happen like that. I'm thinking I was in LA when I recorded that song [I’m On One] I played it for him after I did it. Once it was done, I played the record for him."

Composition
The song sees Future and Drake rapping about indulging in their opulence, which involves a lifestyle of drugs and sex.

Charts

References

2022 songs
Future (rapper) songs
Drake (musician) songs
Songs written by Future (rapper)
Songs written by Drake (musician)